During the 2006-07 season A.C. Milan competed in Serie A, Coppa Italia and UEFA Champions League

Summary
The 2006–07 season has had its ups and downs for Milan. Having started the 2006–07 Serie A season with an eight-point penalty due to the Calciopoli scandal, a poor run of results during which Milan failed to win for nine-straight matches left them in a lowly 15th place on only 11 points. After two consecutive losses against Atalanta and Roma, Milan had a streak of seven-straight undefeated matches. Two wins against Catania and Udinese left Milan only six points behind fourth place and qualification for the 2007–08 UEFA Champions League. Milan eventually finished fourth in Serie A, behind Lazio. After displaying poor physical condition throughout most of the fall, the team took a January retreat in Malta to regain condition and try to achieve a fourth-place finish in Serie A and further progression in the Champions League.

Milan's performances in the Champions League were a different story. Drawn in a group described as easy by some pundits, with AEK Athens, Lille and Anderlecht, Milan won the group with 10 points despite losing the last two games. Milan eventually won the Champions League, overcoming Celtic in the round of 16, Bayern Munich in the quarter-finals, Manchester United in the semi-finals and Liverpool in the final. Kaká was in strong form for Milan in the Champions League, scoring 10 goals in 12 matches and winning that year's Champions League Golden Boot.

Squad

Transfers

Winter

Competitions

Serie A

League table

Results summary

Results by round

Matches

Coppa Italia

Round of 16

Quarter-finals

Semi-finals

UEFA Champions League

Qualifying rounds

Third qualifying round

Group stage

Knockout phase

Round of 16

Quarter-finals

Semi-finals

Final

Statistics

Players statistics

References

A.C. Milan seasons
Milan
UEFA Champions League-winning seasons